Preoccupations is a Canadian post-punk band from Calgary, Alberta, formed in 2012 under the name Viet Cong. The band consists of Matt Flegel (vocals, bass), Scott Munro (guitar, synth), Daniel Christiansen (guitar) and Mike Wallace (drums). Flegel and Wallace had previously been members of the band Women, which broke up in 2010. The group's musical style has been described as "labyrinthine post-punk".

History

Formation and Viet Cong (2012–2015)
In 2010, the band Women entered an indefinite hiatus after an onstage fight. That band's guitarist, Christopher Reimer, died in 2012. Following Reimer's death and the disbanding of Women, ex-Women bassist Flegel decided to form a new band with guitarist Munro (formerly of Lab Coast); the two had recently toured together as live musicians for Chad VanGaalen. They recruited ex-Women drummer Wallace and guitarist Christiansen (the latter previously performed in a Black Sabbath cover band alongside Flegel and Wallace).

The band's debut EP, a self-released cassette, was issued in 2013.

The band performed at SXSW festival in 2014, and then signed to Canadian record label Flemish Eye. The band's cassette release was reissued by Mexican Summer on vinyl on July 8, 2014.

The band released their debut album, Viet Cong, on January 20, 2015, on Jagjaguwar and Flemish Eye. The band announced plans for a North American and European tour to promote the album.

Name change and Preoccupations (2016–2017)
The band frequently faced controversy over their original name, involving accusations of both racism and cultural appropriation because of the name's association with the original Vietnamese Viet Cong. In March 2015, the band was set to perform at Oberlin College, but the show was cancelled due to their "offensive name".

In September 2015, the band announced that they were going to change their name, posting to their Facebook page, "We are a band who wants to make music and play our music for our fans. We are not here to cause pain or remind people of atrocities of the past". On March 29, 2016, the Canadian music magazine Exclaim! reported that the band were still booking shows under the name Viet Cong, and began running a real-time "Days since Viet Cong promised to change their name" counter on the magazine's website.

On April 21, 2016, Flegel announced in a Pitchfork interview that the band would henceforth be performing and recording under the name "Preoccupations". Their second studio album, Preoccupations, was released as a self-titled album under the name Preoccupations on September 16, 2016.

New Material and Arrangements (2018–present)
On January 16, 2018, the band previewed a new single, "Espionage". Their third studio album, New Material, was released on March 23, 2018.

On October 5, 2020, the band announced on Twitter that they were working on a new album. This, their fourth studio album, titled Arrangements, was released on September 9, 2022.

Musical style
The group's musical style has mainly been described as "post-punk". The band's debut cassette was described as a combination of "crooning post-punk vocals, distant-sounding harmonies à la Nuggets-era psychedelia, noise-addled punk, and Blade Runner-style instrumentals".

Band members
 Matt Flegel – bass, vocals
 Mike Wallace – drums
 Scott "Monty" Munro – guitar, synth
 Daniel Christiansen – guitar

Discography

Studio albums
 Viet Cong (as Viet Cong) (2015, Flemish Eye/Jagjaguwar) 
 Preoccupations (2016, Flemish Eye/Jagjaguwar)
 New Material (2018, Flemish Eye/Jagjaguwar)
 Arrangements (2022, Flemish Eye/Jagjaguwar)

EPs
 Cassette (2013, self-released/Mexican Summer)

Singles
 "Throw It Away" (2013, self-released)
 "Continental Shelf" (2014, Jagjaguwar)
 "Bunker Buster" (2014, Jagjaguwar)
 "Silhouettes" (2014, Jagjaguwar)
 "Anxiety" (2016, Jagjaguwar)
 "Stimulation" (2016, Jagjaguwar)
 "Degraded" (2016, Jagjaguwar)
 "Memory" (2016, Jagjaguwar)
 "Key / Off Duty Trip" (2016, Jagjaguwar)
 "Espionage" (2018, Jagjaguwar)
 "Antidote" (2018, Jagjaguwar)
 "Disarray" (2018, Jagjaguwar)
 "Decompose" (2018, Jagjaguwar)
 "Pontiac 87" (2018, Jagjaguwar)
 "Ricochet" (2022, self-released)
 "Death of Melody" (2022, self-released)
 "Slowly" (2022, self-released)

References

External links
 
 

Musical groups established in 2012
Canadian indie rock groups
Canadian post-punk music groups
Canadian art rock groups
Musical groups from Calgary
Musical quartets
2012 establishments in Alberta
Jagjaguwar artists